Kaisar Jahan is an Indian politician. In the 2009 election she was elected to the Lok Sabha from Sitapur in Uttar Pradesh as a member of the Bahujan Samaj Party. She later left the party and joined Congress in the year 2018.

References

External links
Official Biographical Sketch in Lok Sabha Website

India MPs 2009–2014
Living people
Women in Uttar Pradesh politics
21st-century Indian women politicians
21st-century Indian politicians
People from Sitapur district
Lok Sabha members from Uttar Pradesh
Year of birth missing (living people)
Bahujan Samaj Party politicians from Uttar Pradesh